Wyoming Highway 270 (WYO 270) is a  north–south Wyoming State Road located in northeastern Platte County and southwestern Niobrara County.

Route description

Guernsey to Manville
Wyoming Highway 270 starts at its southern end in Platte County at US 26 on the eastern edge of Guernsey. From here Highway 270 heads north as Hartville Highway on its way to the town of the same name. WYO 270 reaches Hartville at approximately 4.5 miles, and intersects the western terminus of Wyoming Highway 318 (Main Street). Wyoming Highway 270 continues north, leaving Hartville to head north to Manville and Lance Creek. At almost 40 miles, WYO 270 intersects US 18/US 20 just before entering Manville. Upon entering Manville, the former Wyoming Highway 274 (9th Avenue) is intersected. Highway 274 was designated for the old alignment of US 18/US 20, but was decommissioned in the early 1990s.

Manville to End
North of Manville, Highway 270 heads to Lance Creek and intersects the eastern terminus of Wyoming Highway 271 (Twentymile Road). Wyoming Highway 270 then begins to turn east as the last length of its routing is primarily east–west. Wyoming Highway 272 (N. Lance Creek Road) is intersected at just under 61 miles. At just over 73 miles, WYO 270 reaches its northern (or eastern) end at US 18/US 85 north of Lusk.

History 
The section of Wyoming Highway 270 from US 26 at Guernsey north to Hartville at present day Wyoming Highway 318 was formerly designated as Wyoming Highway 318 prior to the 1970s. Highway 318 used to begin as US 26 at Guernsey and end at Sunrise with a 90 degree turn at Hartville. The stretch between Guernsey and Hartville was recommissioned as Wyoming Highway 270 when that road was completed between Manville and Hartville.

Major intersections

See also

 List of state highways in Wyoming
 List of highways numbered 270

References

Official 2003 State Highway Map of Wyoming

External links

Wyoming State Routes 200-299
WYO 270 - US 18/US 85 to WYO 272
WYO 270 - WYO 272 to WYO 271
WYO 270 - WYO 271 to US 18/US 20
WYO 270 - US 18/US 20 to WYO 318
WYO 270 - WYO 318 to US 16

Transportation in Platte County, Wyoming
Transportation in Niobrara County, Wyoming
270